Minnehaha Icefalls is a small, heavily crevassed icefall descending the steep western slopes of Mount England and forming a southern tributary to New Glacier, close west of its terminus at Granite Harbour, Victoria Land, Antarctica. It was charted and named by a party of the British Antarctic Expedition (1910–13) led by Thomas Griffith Taylor. The name, after Minnehaha, was suggested by Frank Debenham.

References

Icefalls of Antarctica
Landforms of Victoria Land
Scott Coast